The Gwinnett Chamber of Commerce' is Gwinnett County, Georgia's non-profit, member-funded business advocacy organization, representing a number of businesses within Gwinnett and the metro Atlanta region.

The Gwinnett Chamber of Commerce hired seven new staff members and created national and global marketing teams after Gwinnett County revamped its development strategy in 2007 to prevent the slowing of the area's job growth. The Gwinnett Chamber recently won five projects —including a 75-job expansion of Habasit America, a Suwanee, Ga., belting company, and a 300-job unit of California's YesVideo Inc., which transfers VHS to DVD. The Gwinnett Chamber is responsible for bringing at least 5,000 new jobs to the county in the past 24 months.

The Gwinnett Chamber represents business organizations seeking to further their collective interests, while advancing their community, region, state or nation through voluntary networks and societies. The Gwinnett Chamber builds stronger communities by focusing on business, civic, and political priorities in the local and regional community to ensure a high quality of life. These issues include transportation and water; education and workforce development; revitalization and redevelopment; healthcare; arts and culture; and protecting our pro-business environment. Employing over 750,000 workers across the metro Atlanta and Georgia Innovation Crescent regions, The Gwinnett Chamber works to create jobs and wealth, strengthen community and quality of life and grow businesses.

Mission statement
"To champion business."

History 
The idea of a community-based institution to represent the unified interests of Gwinnett County businesses was first organized on May 22, 1947. Since its inception, Gwinnett County continues promoting target industry efforts across the world, with nearly 3,000 members representing large and small, domestic and international businesses. The Gwinnett Chamber is at the center of Gwinnett's growth and development, and facilitates the establishment of new businesses and the expansion of existing ones. For more than 70 years, the Gwinnett Chamber of Commerce has worked to promote the business, educational and cultural resources in the county.

Board of directors
 Nick Masino, President and CEO

Economic Development

Partnership Gwinnett 

In 2007, the Gwinnett Chamber economic development initiative, Partnership Gwinnett, was formed to focus on the recruitment and expansion of target industry sectors which include: health care and life sciences, distribution and trade, headquarters and regional offices, information technology, and advanced communications. With extensive research complete, the Gwinnett Chamber of Commerce along with partners in government, education, healthcare and business are readily implementing Gwinnett's Community and Economic Development Plan known as Partnership Gwinnett. The plan will serve to create over 65,000 new jobs and $5.8 billion in new net wealth in Gwinnett over the next five years.

In June 2008, the American Chamber of Commerce Executives (ACCE) chose Gwinnett Chamber of Commerce Economic Development initiative, Partnership Gwinnett, from among more than 200 Chamber entries to win the largest recognition for economic and community development initiatives, the Award of Excellence. The Awards for Communication Excellence (ACE) is an annual competition that recognizes excellence in all areas of communications.

Programs 

 After Hours
 Ambassadors Council
 Annual Dinner
 Business RadioX "The Voice of Business"
 Button Down Dash 5k
 Candidates Forum Series
 Chairman's Club Golf Invitational
 Chairman's Club Welcome Breakfast
 Chairman's Club Receptions
 Cities Guide
 Diversity, Equity, and Inclusion Summit
 Fall Classic Golf Tournament
 Guide to Gwinnett
 Gwinnett Chamber 101
 Gwinnett Day at the Capitol
 Gwinnett Leadership Organization for Women (GLOW)
 Gwinnett Young Professionals (GYP)
 GYP Grow
 GYP Connect
 GYP Impact
 GYP Journey Leadership Institute
 TheYParty celebrating 35 Under 35
 Gwinnettworking
 Human Resource Management Association (HRMA)
 HRMA Employment Law Seminar
 Key Leadership Reception
 Moxie Awards
 Multi-Chamber Mixer
 On Topic
 Partnership Gwinnett
 Dinner Series
 Economic Outlook
 The Intern Mix
 Lean Breakfast Club
 Metro Atlanta Redevelopment Summit
 Movers & Makers Awards
 New Company Reception
 Redevelopment Forum
 Redevelopment Peer Tour
 STAR Student
 State of Technology Summit
Principal for a Day
Ribbon Cuttings & Ground Breakings
 Small Business Awards
 Small Business Series
 Small Business Week
 Sporting Clays Tournament
 State of the County Address
 Strategic Leadership Visit
 Washington DC Fly-in

On the Issues 
 Business Development
 Transportation
 Water
 Education
 Workforce Development
 Redevelopment & Revitalization
 Health care
 Arts and Culture
 Foreign Trade
 Regional Economic Development

Community Enhancements 
 2030 Unified Plan
 Opportunity Zones (OZ)
 Community Improvement Districts (CID)
 Tax Allocation Districts (TAD)
 Lets Do Business Gwinnett
 Engage Gwinnett

References 

Organizations based in Georgia (U.S. state)
Gwinnett County, Georgia
Chambers of commerce in the United States